Carlisle Melrose Byron Jarvis (10 December 1906 – 6 November 1979) was an Australian rules footballer at East Fremantle in the West Australian National Football League (WANFL).

Jarvis spent twelve seasons with East Fremantle where he was a specialist defender. "Bub" Jarvis had his best year in 1934 where he was runner up in the Sandover Medal count and won a Lynn Medal. He played in seven East Fremantle premiership sides and represented the Western Australian interstate team on eight occasions. In the 1932–33 summer he played a first-class cricket match for his state, making three runs and taking two catches.

He was selected, in 2007, as a half back flanker in the Fremantle Team of Legends.

External links

1906 births
1979 deaths
East Fremantle Football Club players
West Australian Football Hall of Fame inductees
Australian cricketers
Western Australia cricketers
Cricketers from Fremantle
Australian rules footballers from Fremantle